B. lepidus may refer to:

 Bombus lepidus, a bumblebee species in the genus Bombus
 Bromus lepidus, a grass species in the genus Bromus

See also
 Lepidus (disambiguation)